John Keating (10 September 1927 – 28 May 2015) was a Scottish musician, songwriter, arranger and trombonist.

Biography
Keating was born in Edinburgh, Scotland. After studying piano and trombone, he taught himself how to arrange and compose in his teens. From 1952, he worked with British big band leader Ted Heath as a trombonist, but within two years Heath asked him to become his primary arranger. In the early 1960s, he and songwriter Johnny Worth (writing as Les Vandyke) masterminded the career of a minor British pop star, Eden Kane. The team wrote and produced a string of British top 10 hits for Kane in 1961–63. In addition he wrote, produced or arranged hits by Adam Faith, Petula Clark, Anthony Newley, Shani Wallis, Caterina Valente, and Sammy Davis Jr. among others.

Keating arranged and conducted a series of albums for London Records' Phase 4 series, notable for its use of synthesiser technology such as the Moog synthesizer and the EMS VCS 3. The records were often used as demonstration discs in the 1970s in Hi-Fi stores because of their quality. Much of his work was rereleased following the Lounge music revival of the mid 1990s and its use as breakbeats.

His "Theme from Z-Cars", a #8 hit in the 1962 UK Singles Chart, was adopted by Everton as their theme song. Additionally he composed the scores for the films Hotel (1967), Robbery (1967), and Innocent Bystanders (1972). His song "Bunny Hop" was also featured in the Tim Burton film, Ed Wood (1994).

As founder and principal of the Johnny Keating School of Music, Edinburgh, he was directly responsible for the musical education of many students who later became successful professionals.

In 1999, he completed a four–volume academic reference book dedicated to the art of professional songwriting: Principles of Songwriting: A Study in Structure and Technique.

Keating died in London, England, on 28 May 2015 at the age of 87.

Album discography
English Jazz - 1956 - Bally
Swinging Scots - 1957 - Dot
Percussive Moods SP44005 - 1963 - London Phase 4 Stereo
Temptation SP44019 - 1963 - London Phase 4 Stereo
Swing Revisited SP44034 - 1963 - London Phase 4 Stereo
Johnny Keating and 27 Men-The Keating Sound SP44058 - 1966 - London Phase 4 Stereo
Keating...Straight Ahead SP44072 - 1966 - London Phase 4 Stereo
This Bird Has Flown WS1638 - 1966 - Warner Bros.
Here's Where It Is WS1666 - 1966 - Warner Bros.
Sounds Galactic - An Astromusical Odyssey SP44154 - 1971 - London Phase 4 Stereo
Space Experience CQ 32382 - 1972 - Columbia Records
John Keating Conducts the London Symphony Orchestra - 1972
Songs of Love - John & Thelma Keating with the London Symphony Orchestra (1973)
John Keating Conducts the Electronic Philharmonic Orchestra - 1974 - EMI
"Fanfare for the Common Man"
"Sabre Dance"
"Tristan und Isolde: Prelude, Act III"
"Lohengrin: Prelude, Act III"
"Hebridean Impressions" (written by Keating)
Space Experience, Vol. 1 & 2 - 1998 - EMI (Vol. 1 contains the LP Space Experience)
Temptation & Percussive Moods - 2004 - Vocalion
Swing Revisited - 2004 - Dutton Vocalion
British Jazz - 2005 - Harkit
British Jazz and Swinging Scots - 2008 - British Jazz

Songwriting credits
"A Little Waltzin'"
"Barber Shop Jump" - Ted Heath
"Come Live With Me" - Carmen McRae
"Headin' North"
"It's Not Going That Way" - Carmen McRae, Vic Lewis
"Merry Merry-Go-Round (Theme from 'The Jean Arthur Show')"
"On With the Don" - Ted Heath
"Same Old Moon" - Percy Faith
"Send for Henry" - Heinz Schonberger, Henry Main
"The Clown"
"This Hotel" aka "Hotel" - Carmen McRae, Percy Faith, Shirley Horn, Nancy Wilson, Stan Kenton, Todd Gordon

References

External links
 Keating's official Myspace page
 
 jazzprofessional.com profile by  Ron Simmonds
 [ Allmusic.com biography]  by Eugene Chadbourne
 John Keating's Official Site by Martin Keating

1927 births
2015 deaths
Musicians from Edinburgh
Scottish songwriters
Scottish record producers
Scottish trombonists
Scottish conductors (music)
British male conductors (music)
British music arrangers
Music directors
Fly Records artists
London Records artists
Dot Records artists
Vocalion Records artists
Columbia Records artists
Decca Records artists
EMI Records artists
Warner Records artists
Jazz arrangers
British male jazz musicians
British male songwriters